"Melody of Love (Wanna Be Loved)" is a song by American singer and songwriter Donna Summer. The song was released in October 1994 by Mercury Records and Casablanca Records as a new track and the lead single for her 1994 hits compilation album, Endless Summer. It was written by Summer, David Cole, Robert Clivillés and Joe Carrano, and produced by Summer and Welcome Productions. The song just missed the top 20 in the United Kingdom and was a top-40 hit in Belgium. It was formed with several remixes and was her tenth number one hit on the US Billboard Hot Dance Club Songs chart. In Australia, the single peaked at number 79 in December 1994. It was awarded the ASCAP Dance Song of the Year prize in 1996.

Critical reception
Alex Henderson from AllMusic complimented Summer, that "still sounds incredibly fresh" on the song. Larry Flick from Billboard stated that it "proves that her voice is stronger now than ever." He added, "She soars with spine-tingling power over a pop-house arrangement that nicks an idea or two from several of her vintage disco hits, while injecting a modern house sensibility that ensures active club exposure." In his weekly UK chart commentary, James Masterton described it as a "rather anodyne piece of disco". Pan-European magazine Music & Media remarked that co-written by David Cole and Robert Clivillés, "Summer returns to '70s disco which first made her famous. Vocally taking untenable hurdles, she could be Whitney's twin sis." 

Alan Jones from Music Week gave the song four out of five, commenting, "Simple piano chords and muted horns usher in Donna's first for a while, but it's just the calm before the storm, as the song explodes in contemporary house style, with pumping bass and her extraordinary voice as durable as ever." James Hamilton from the RM Dance Update declared it as a "typical vintage style but apparently brand new David Cole co-composed song".

Music video
A music video was produced to promote the single, directed by South African director and writer Ralph Ziman. It features Summer in a black dress singing the song and dancing on a balcony. There are musical notes disclaimed under the song's lyrics throughout the video. Other scenes show four dancing men, accompanied with saxophonists, pianist and violinists. David Morales’ Classic Club Radio Edit was used in the video.

Track listings

 UK CD single
 "Melody of Love (Wanna Be Loved)" (Épris Mix) – 8:33
 "Melody of Love (Wanna Be Loved)" (AJ Humpty's Mix) – 8:46
 "Melody of Love (Wanna Be Loved)" (Mijangos Powertools Trip #1) – 5:55
 "Melody of Love (Wanna Be Loved)" (Classic Club Mix) – 8:04

 US CD maxi-single
 "Melody of Love (Wanna Be Loved)" (Original Version) – 4:16
 "Melody of Love (Wanna Be Loved)" (Classic Club Mix) – 8:03
 "Melody of Love (Wanna Be Loved)" (Boss Mix) – 6:58
 "Melody of Love (Wanna Be Loved)" (Épris Mix) – 8:33
 "Melody of Love (Wanna Be Loved)" (AJ & Humpty's Anthem Mix) – 8:46
 "Melody of Love (Wanna Be Loved)" (Épris Radio Mix) – 4:14
 "On the Radio – 5:50
 "The Christmas Song (Chestnuts Roasting on an Open Fire)" – 4:20

 Australian CD maxi-single
 "Melody of Love (Wanna Be Loved)" (Original Version) – 4:16
 "Melody of Love (Wanna Be Loved)" (Classic Club Mix) – 8:03
 "Melody of Love (Wanna Be Loved)" (Boss Mix) – 6:58
 "Melody of Love (Wanna Be Loved)" (Épris Mix) – 8:33
 "Melody of Love (Wanna Be Loved)" (AJ & Humpty's Anthem Mix) – 8:46
 "Melody of Love (Wanna Be Loved)" (Épris Radio Mix) – 4:14
 "On the Radio – 5:50
 "The Christmas Song (Chestnuts Roasting on an Open Fire)" – 4:20

Charts

See also
 List of number-one dance singles of 1995 (U.S.)

References

Donna Summer songs
1994 singles
1994 songs
Casablanca Records
House music songs
Mercury Records singles
Songs about music
Songs written by David Cole (record producer)
Songs written by Donna Summer
Songs written by Robert Clivillés